Robert Renaut Beezer (July 21, 1928 – March 30, 2012) was a United States circuit judge of the United States Court of Appeals for the Ninth Circuit.

Education and career

Born in Seattle, Washington, Beezer received a Bachelor of Arts degree from the University of Virginia in 1951 and a Bachelor of Laws from the University of Virginia School of Law in 1956. He was a United States Marine Corps Reserve Lieutenant from 1951 to 1953. He was in private practice in Seattle from 1956 to 1984, serving as a Judge pro tem on the Seattle Municipal Court from 1962 to 1976.

Federal judicial service

On March 2, 1984, Beezer was nominated by President Ronald Reagan to a seat on the United States Court of Appeals for the Ninth Circuit vacated by Judge Eugene Allen Wright. Beezer was confirmed by the United States Senate on March 27, 1984, and received his commission on March 28, 1984. He assumed senior status on July 31, 1996.

Death

Beezer died from lung cancer in Seattle on March 30, 2012, at age 83.

References

External links
 
 Graveyard

1928 births
2012 deaths
Lawyers from Seattle
University of Virginia alumni
University of Virginia School of Law alumni
Washington (state) state court judges
Judges of the United States Court of Appeals for the Ninth Circuit
United States court of appeals judges appointed by Ronald Reagan
20th-century American judges
United States Marine Corps officers